The Wairakei River or Wairakei Stream is a river of the Waikato Region of New Zealand's North Island. It flows southeast to meet the Waikato River, which it does at the town of Wairakei, 10 kilometres north of Taupo.

See also
List of rivers of New Zealand

References

Taupō District
Rivers of Waikato
Rivers of New Zealand